Coronaviridae is a family of enveloped, positive-strand RNA viruses which infect amphibians, birds, and mammals. The group includes the subfamilies Letovirinae and Orthocoronavirinae; the members of the latter are known as coronaviruses.

The viral genome is 26–32 kilobases in length. The particles are typically decorated with large (~20 nm), club- or petal-shaped surface projections (the "peplomers" or "spikes"), which in electron micrographs of spherical particles create an image reminiscent of the solar corona.

Virology

The 5' and 3' ends of the genome have a cap and poly(A) tract, respectively. The viral envelope, obtained by budding through membranes of the endoplasmic reticulum (ER) or Golgi apparatus, invariably contains two virus-specified glycoprotein species, known as the spike (S) and membrane (M) proteins. The spike protein makes up the large surface projections (sometimes known as peplomers), while the membrane protein is a triple-spanning transmembrane protein. Toroviruses and a select subset of coronaviruses (in particular the members of subgroup A in the genus Betacoronavirus) possess, in addition to the peplomers composed of S, a second type of surface projections composed of the hemagglutinin-esterase protein. Another important structural protein is the phosphoprotein nucleocapsid protein (N), which is responsible for the helical symmetry of the nucleocapsid that encloses the genomic RNA. The fourth and smallest viral structural protein is known as the envelope protein (E), thought to be involved in viral budding.

Genetic recombination can occur when at least two viral genomes are present in the same infected host cell.  RNA recombination appears to be a major driving force in coronavirus evolution.  Recombination can determine genetic variability within a CoV species, the capability of a CoV species to jump from one host to another and, infrequently, the emergence of a novel CoV.  The exact mechanism of recombination in CoVs is not known, but likely involves template switching during genome replication.

Taxonomy

The family Coronaviridae is organized in 2 sub-families, 5 genera, 26 sub-genera, and 46 species. Additional species are pending or tentative.
Coronaviridae
Orthocoronavirinae
Letovirinae
Alphaletovirus
Milecovirus
Microhyla letovirus 1

Coronavirus

Coronavirus is the common name for Coronaviridae and Orthocoronavirinae, also called Coronavirinae. Coronaviruses cause diseases in mammals and birds. In humans, the viruses cause respiratory infections. Four human coronaviruses cause typically minor symptoms of a common cold, while three are known to cause more serious illness and can be lethal: SARS-CoV-1, which causes SARS; MERS-CoV, which causes MERS; and SARS-CoV-2, which causes COVID-19. Symptoms vary in other species: in chickens, they cause an upper respiratory disease, while in cows and pigs coronaviruses cause diarrhea. Other than for SARS-CoV-2, there are no vaccines or antiviral drugs to prevent or treat human coronavirus infections. They are enveloped viruses with a positive-sense single-stranded RNA genome and a nucleocapsid of helical symmetry. The genome size of coronaviruses ranges from approximately 26 to 32 kilobases, among the largest for an RNA virus (second only to a 41-kb nidovirus recently discovered in planaria).

Orthocoronavirinae taxonomy

Orthocoronavirinae
Alphacoronavirus
Colacovirus
Bat coronavirus CDPHE15
Decacovirus
Bat coronavirus HKU10
Rhinolophus ferrumequinum alphacoronavirus HuB-2013
Duvinacovirus
Human coronavirus 229E
Luchacovirus
Lucheng Rn rat coronavirus
Minacovirus
Mink coronavirus 1
Minunacovirus
Miniopterus bat coronavirus 1
Miniopterus bat coronavirus HKU8
Myotacovirus
Myotis ricketti alphacoronavirus Sax-2011
Nyctacovirus
Nyctalus velutinus alphacoronavirus SC-2013
Pipistrellus kuhlii coronavirus 3398
Pedacovirus
Porcine epidemic diarrhea virus
Scotophilus bat coronavirus 512
Rhinacovirus
Rhinolophus bat coronavirus HKU2
Setracovirus
Human coronavirus NL63
NL63-related bat coronavirus strain BtKYNL63-9b
Soracovirus
Sorex araneus coronavirus T14
Sunacovirus
Suncus murinus coronavirus X74
Tegacovirus
Alphacoronavirus 1
Betacoronavirus
Embecovirus
Betacoronavirus 1
Human coronavirus OC43
China Rattus coronavirus HKU24
Human coronavirus HKU1
Murine coronavirus
Myodes coronavirus 2JL14
Hibecovirus
Bat Hp-betacoronavirus Zhejiang2013
Merbecovirus
Hedgehog coronavirus 1
Middle East respiratory syndrome-related coronavirus (MERS-CoV)
Pipistrellus bat coronavirus HKU5
Tylonycteris bat coronavirus HKU4
Nobecovirus
Eidolon bat coronavirus C704
Rousettus bat coronavirus GCCDC1
Rousettus bat coronavirus HKU9
Sarbecovirus
Severe acute respiratory syndrome–related coronavirus
Severe acute respiratory syndrome coronavirus (SARS-CoV)
Severe acute respiratory syndrome coronavirus 2 (SARS-CoV-2, cause of COVID-19)
Gammacoronavirus
Brangacovirus
Goose coronavirus CB17
Cegacovirus
Beluga whale coronavirus SW1
Igacovirus
Avian coronavirus
Avian coronavirus 9203
Duck coronavirus 2714
Deltacoronavirus
Andecovirus
Wigeon coronavirus HKU20
Buldecovirus
Bulbul coronavirus HKU11
Common moorhen coronavirus HKU21
Coronavirus HKU15
Munia coronavirus HKU13
White-eye coronavirus HKU16
Herdecovirus
Night heron coronavirus HKU19

References

External links

Virus Pathogen Database and Analysis Resource (ViPR): Coronaviridae
Archived Web page from 2006 on coronaviruses
Focus on Coronaviruses (Microbiology Blog post from 2007)
Viralzone: Coronaviridae
International Committee on Taxonomy of Viruses

 
Nidovirales
Virus families